Liceo Classico statale Jacopo Stellini is a liceo classico in Udine, Italy, for pupils aged 14 to 19. The high school was founded in 1808, making it the oldest liceo classico in Udine. During World War I, Luigi Cadorna placed the headquarters of the Italian Army in the part of the school that had just been built in 1915, and after the war the liceo moved to its present location.

Teaching
The subjects that are studied in most depth are classical studies (Latin language and literature and ancient Greek Language and literature) and humanities (history, philosophy and Italian literature), though in recent years subjects like English language, science and mathematics have been increasing in importance.

The library
Liceo Stellini's library is very prestigious: it contains two manuscripts from the 15th century, twelve incunables and hundreds of books from the 16th to 19th centuries.

Notable teachers and students

 Elio Bartolini, writer and poet
 Giuseppe Battiston, actor
 Lodovico di Caporiacco, scientist and political scientist
 Ardito Desio, geologist and explorer
 Mauro Ferrari, scientist
 Egidio Feruglio, explorer, naturalist and geologist
 Loris Fortuna, politician and partisan
 Massimo Giacomini, football player and manager
 Paolo Moreno, historian
 Gaetano Perusini, neurologist
 Giandomenico Picco, UN deputy secretary
 Bruno Pizzul, football player and journalist

Bibliography
 Federico Vicario, Il liceo classico Jacopo Stellini: duecento anni nel cuore del Friuli, Udine, Forum Edizioni, 2010,

External links
 Official school website

Education in Udine
Educational institutions established in 1808
Liceo classico
Buildings and structures in Udine
Schools in Friuli-Venezia Giulia